Baron Dominique Jean Larrey (8 July 1766 – 25 July 1842) was a French surgeon and military doctor, who distinguished himself in the French Revolutionary Wars and the Napoleonic Wars. An important innovator in battlefield medicine and triage, he is often considered the first modern military surgeon.

Early life and career
Larrey was born in the little village of Beaudéan, in the Pyrenees as the son of a shoemaker, who later moved to Bordeaux. He was orphaned at the age of 13, and was then raised by his uncle Alexis, who was chief surgeon in Toulouse. After an 8-year apprenticeship, he went to Paris to study under Pierre-Joseph Desault, who was chief surgeon at the Hôtel-Dieu de Paris.  Larrey then went to Brest, where he was appointed surgeon in the navy and began lecturing. In 1787 he boarded a ship deployed to the defense of Newfoundland, and was, at nearly 21 years-old at the time, the youngest medical officer in the French Royal Navy. While in America, Larrey took an interest in the local environment, writing observations on the local flora, fauna, climate and manners, which were published years later in his  Mémoires de chirurgie militaire et campagnes du baron D.J. Larrey.

In 1789, Larrey was back in Paris, where he worked with Jean-Nicolas Corvisart, Xavier Bichat and Raphaël Bienvenu Sabatier in Les Invalides. On 14 July, during the Storming of the Bastille, he improvised an ambulance to treat the wounded.

Revolutionary Wars 

A supporter of the ideas of the Revolution, Larrey joined the French Army of the Rhine in 1792, during the War of the First Coalition. In Mainz he met with Samuel Thomas von Sömmerring. During this time, Larrey initiated the modern method of army surgery, field hospitals and the system of army ambulance corps. After seeing the speed with which the carriages of the French flying artillery maneuvered across the battlefields, Larrey adapted them as ambulance volantes ("Flying ambulances") for rapid transport of the wounded and manned them with trained crews of drivers, corpsmen and litterbearers.

At the Battle of Metz (1793) Larrey successfully demonstrated the value of field ambulances. The quartermaster-general Jacques-Pierre Orillard de Villemanzy ordered prototypes to be built, after which ambulances would be supplied to all the Republic's armies. The politicians heard of this, and ordered a national contest to find the best design, thus delaying their delivery by over two years. Larrey also increased the mobility and improved the organization of field hospitals, effectively creating a forerunner of the modern MASH units. He established a rule for the triage of war casualties, treating the wounded according to the seriousness of their injuries and urgency of need for medical care, regardless of their rank or nationality. Soldiers of enemy armies, as well as those of the French and their allies, were treated.

In 1794 he was sent to Toulon, where he met for the first time with Napoleon Bonaparte. He married the painter Marie-Élisabeth Laville-Leroux. In Spain he fell ill and was sent back to Paris, where he worked as a professor of anatomy at the Val-de-Grâce Medical School for a short time, in 1796, before being appointed surgeon-in-chief of the Revolutionary armies in Italy.

Larrey departed with the Egyptian campaign in 1798. Following the victory at the Battle of Abukir, he established a medical school for army physicians in Cairo. Many of his patients at the time were affacted by ophthalmy, a disease known in Europe since the Crusades, which Larrey studied and wrote about in his memoirs. He improved the transportation of wounded soldiers through the use of dromedaries, with two chests attached to each side of their hump to carry the wounded, instead of horses of difficult movement in the desert. He was wounded during the  Siege of Acre. Larrey returned to France in October 1801.

Napoleonic Wars

Larrey was made a Commander of the Légion d'honneur on 12 May 1807. He joined in the Battle of Aspern-Essling, where he operated on Marshal Jean Lannes and amputated one of his legs in two minutes. He became the favorite of the Emperor, who commented, "If the army ever erects a monument to express its gratitude, it should do so in honor of Larrey", he was ennobled as a Baron on the field of Wagram in 1809. In 1811, Baron Larrey co-led the surgical team that performed a pre-anesthetic mastectomy on Frances Burney in Paris. His detailed account of this operation gives insight into early 19th century doctor-patient relationships, and early surgical methods in the home of the patient. Larrey was involved in the French invasion of Russia.

When Napoleon was sent to Elba, Larrey proposed to join him, but the former Emperor refused. At Waterloo in 1815 his courage under fire was noticed by the Duke of Wellington who ordered his soldiers not to fire in his direction so as to "give the brave man time to gather up the wounded" and saluted "the courage and devotion of an age that is no longer ours". Trying to escape to the French border, Larrey was taken prisoner by the Prussians who wanted to execute him on the spot. Larrey was recognized by one of the German surgeons, who pleaded for his life. Perhaps partly because he had saved the life of Blücher's son when he was wounded near Dresden and taken prisoner by the French, he was pardoned, invited to Blücher's dinner table as a guest and sent back to France with money and proper clothes.

Later career
He devoted the remainder of his life to writing, but after the death of Napoleon he started a new medical career in the army as chief-surgeon. In 1826 he visited England, received well by British surgeons. In 1829 he was appointed in the Institut de France. A year later, he was elected as a member of the American Philosophical Society. In 1842 he went to Algiers for a health inspection, together with his son, but contracted pneumonia on his way back, dying in Lyon on 25 July. His body was taken to Paris and buried at the Père-Lachaise Cemetery. His remains were transferred to Les Invalides and re-interred near Napoleon's tomb in December 1992.

Larrey's writings are still regarded as valuable sources of surgical and medical knowledge and have been translated into all modern languages. Between 1800 and 1840 at least 28 books or articles were published. His son Hippolyte (born 1808) was surgeon-in-ordinary to the emperor Napoleon III.

Works
 Relation historique et chirurgicale de l’expédition de l’armée d’orient, en Egypte et en Syrie. Demonville, Paris 1803.
 Mémoires de chirurgie militaire, et campagnes. J. Smith, Paris 1812. (digitalized books: Volume1, Volume 2, Volume 3)
 Richard H. Willmott: Memoirs of military surgery. Cushing, Baltimore 1814. (volumes 1–3, digitalized book)
 John C. Mercer: Surgical memoirs of the campaigns of Russia, Germany, and France. Carey & Lea, Philadelphia 1832. (volume 4, digitalized Book)

NATO Award
The Dominique-Jean Larrey Award is the North Atlantic Alliance's highest medical honour. It is bestowed annually by NATO's senior medical body, the Committee of Chiefs of Military Medical Services in NATO (COMEDS), which is composed of the Surgeons General of NATO and partner nations. It is awarded in recognition of a significant and lasting contribution to NATO multi-nationality and/or interoperability, or to improvements in the provision of health care in NATO missions in the areas of medical support or healthcare development.

References

Bibliography

External links 

The Revolutionary Flying Ambulance of Napoleon's Surgeon
In Larrey's shadow: transport of British sick and wounded in the Napoleonic wars.
Larrey, D. J. Memoirs of Military Surgery and Campaigns of the French Armies, Classics of Surgery Library, 1985, reprint of Joseph Cushing, 1814

1766 births
1842 deaths
People from Hautes-Pyrénées
Barons Larrey
French military doctors
Burials at Père Lachaise Cemetery
Recipients of Prussian royal pardons
French prisoners sentenced to death
Prisoners sentenced to death by Prussia
Members of the French Academy of Sciences
Commandeurs of the Légion d'honneur
18th-century French physicians
19th-century French physicians
Names inscribed under the Arc de Triomphe
Deaths from pneumonia in France